In Norse mythology, Verðandi (Old Norse, meaning possibly "happening" or "present"), sometimes anglicized as Verdandi or Verthandi, is one of the norns. Along with Urðr (Old Norse "fate") and Skuld (possibly "debt" or "future"), Verðandi makes up a trio of Norns that are described as deciding the fates (wyrd) of people.

Etymology
Verðandi is literally the present participle of the Old Norse verb "verða", "to become", and is commonly translated as "in the making" or "that which is happening/becoming"; it is related to the Dutch word worden and the German word werden, both meaning "to become".

Attestation

Völuspá
She appears in the following verse from the Poetic Edda poem Völuspá, along with Urðr and Skuld:

Notes

References
 Orchard, Andy (1997). Dictionary of Norse Myth and Legend. Cassell. 

Norns
Female supernatural figures in Norse mythology
Textiles in folklore
Time and fate goddesses
Gýgjar